This is a list of cities, towns, villages, and hamlets on Long Island.

Introduction 

In New York State, each county is divided into cities and towns.  Every point in New York is inside either a city or a town.  Additionally, towns may optionally contain villages, which are smaller incorporated municipalities within the town.  Villages may overlap multiple towns.  Well-known unincorporated places within towns are referred to as hamlets.

A town or city is the major subdivision of each county. Towns provide or arrange for most municipal services for residents of hamlets and selected services for residents of villages. All residents of New York who do not live in a city or on an Indian reservation live in a town.

A village is an incorporated area which is usually, but not always, within a single town. A village is a clearly defined municipality that provides the services closest to the residents, such as garbage collection, street and highway maintenance, street lighting and building codes. Some villages provide their own police and other optional services. A hamlet is a populated area within a town that is not part of a village. The term "hamlet" is not defined under New York law (unlike cities, towns and villages), but is often used in the state's statutes to refer to well-known populated sections of towns that are not incorporated as villages.

Brooklyn and Queens 

Brooklyn and Queens are part of the City of New York.

Nassau County

City of Glen Cove

City of Long Beach

Town of Hempstead 

The Town of Hempstead contains 22 villages and 35 hamlets:

 Villages: Atlantic Beach, Bellerose, Cedarhurst, East Rockaway, Freeport, Garden City, Hempstead, Hewlett Bay Park, Hewlett Harbor, Hewlett Neck, Island Park, Lawrence, Lynbrook, Malverne, Rockville Centre, South Floral Park, Stewart Manor, Valley Stream, Woodsburgh
 Hamlets: Baldwin, Baldwin Harbor, Barnum Island, Bay Park, Bellerose Terrace, Bellmore, East Atlantic Beach, East Garden City, East Meadow, Elmont, Franklin Square, Garden City South, Harbor Isle, Hewlett, Inwood, Lakeview, Levittown, Lido Beach, Malverne Park Oaks, Merrick, North Bellmore, North Lynbrook, North Merrick, North Valley Stream, North Wantagh, North Woodmere, Oceanside, Point Lookout, Roosevelt, Salisbury, Seaford, South Hempstead, South Valley Stream, Uniondale, Wantagh, West Hempstead, Woodmere
 Villages located partly in the Town of North Hempstead: Floral Park, Garden City (almost all in Hempstead), Mineola (almost all in North Hempstead), New Hyde Park

Town of North Hempstead 

The Town of North Hempstead contains 31 villages.

 Villages: Baxter Estates, East Williston, Flower Hill, Great Neck, Great Neck Estates, Great Neck Plaza, Kensington, Kings Point, Lake Success, Manorhaven, Munsey Park, North Hills, Plandome, Plandome Heights, Plandome Manor, Port Washington North, Roslyn, Roslyn Estates, Russell Gardens, Saddle Rock, Sands Point, Thomaston, Westbury, Williston Park
 Hamlets: Albertson, Carle Place, Garden City Park, Glenwood Landing, Great Neck Gardens, Greenvale, Harbor Hills, Herricks, Manhasset, Manhasset Hills, New Cassel, North New Hyde Park, Port Washington, Roslyn Heights, Saddle Rock Estates, Searingtown, University Gardens
 Villages located partly in the Town of Oyster Bay: East Hills, Old Westbury, Roslyn Harbor

Town of Oyster Bay 

The Town of Oyster Bay contains 18 villages and 18 hamlets:

 Villages: Bayville, Brookville, Centre Island, Cove Neck, Farmingdale, Lattingtown, Laurel Hollow, Massapequa Park, Matinecock, Mill Neck, Muttontown, Old Brookville, Oyster Bay Cove, Sea Cliff, Upper Brookville
 Hamlets: Bethpage, East Massapequa, East Norwich, Glen Head, Glenwood Landing  (part), Greenvale  (part), Hicksville, Jericho, Locust Valley, Massapequa, North Massapequa, Old Bethpage, Oyster Bay, Plainedge, Plainview, South Farmingdale, Syosset, Woodbury
 Villages located partly in the Town of North Hempstead: East Hills, Old Westbury, Roslyn Harbor

The U.S. Postal Service has organized these 36 places into 20 different post offices with a total of 30 different 5-digit ZIP codes. Some post offices have the same name as a hamlet or village, but the boundaries are seldom the same.

Suffolk County

Town of Babylon 

 Villages: Amityville, Babylon, Lindenhurst
 Hamlets: Copiague, Deer Park, East Farmingdale, Gilgo, North Amityville, North Babylon, North Lindenhurst, Oak Beach, Captree, West Babylon, Wheatley Heights, Wyandanch
 Other communities: Copiague Harbor

Town of Huntington

 Villages: Asharoken, Huntington Bay, Lloyd Harbor, Northport
 Hamlets: Centerport, Cold Spring Harbor, Dix Hills, East Northport, Eatons Neck, Elwood, Greenlawn, Halesite, Huntington, Huntington Station, Melville, South Huntington, Vernon Valley, West Hills, Wincoma
 Hamlets located partly in the Town of Smithtown: Commack, Fort Salonga

Town of Islip 

 Villages: Brightwaters, Islandia, Ocean Beach, Saltaire
 Hamlets: Bay Shore, Bayport, Baywood, Bohemia, Brentwood, Central Islip, East Islip, Great River, Islip, Islip Terrace, North Bay Shore, North Great River, Oakdale, Ronkonkoma, Sayville, West Bay Shore, West Islip, West Sayville
 Hamlets located partly in the Town of Brookhaven: Holbrook, Holtsville
 Hamlet located partly in the Town of Smithtown: Hauppauge

Town of Smithtown 

 Villages: Head of the Harbor, Nissequogue, Village of the Branch
 Hamlets: Kings Park, Nesconset, Smithtown, St. James
 Hamlet located partly in the Town of Brookhaven: Lake Ronkonkoma
 Hamlets located partly in the Town of Huntington: Commack, Fort Salonga
 Hamlet located partly in the Town of Islip: Hauppauge

Town of Brookhaven 

 Villages: Belle Terre, Bellport, Lake Grove, Old Field, Patchogue, Poquott, Port Jefferson, Shoreham
 Hamlets: Blue Point, Brookhaven, Canaan Lake, Center Moriches, Centereach, Cherry Grove, Coram, Crystal Brook, Cupsogue Beach, Davis Park, East Moriches, East Patchogue, East Setauket, East Shoreham, East Yaphank, Farmingville, Fire Island Pines, Gordon Heights, Hagerman, Manor Park, Manorville, Mastic, Mastic Acres, Mastic Beach, Medford, Middle Island, Miller Place, Moriches, Mount Sinai, North Bellport, North Patchogue, Ocean Bay Park, Old Mastic, Point of Woods, Port Jefferson Station, Ridge, Rocky Point, Selden, Setauket, Shirley, South Haven, Sound Beach, Stony Brook, Strongs Neck, Terryville, Upton, Water Island, West Manor, Yaphank
 Hamlets located partly in the Town of Islip: Holbrook, Holtsville, Ronkonkoma
 Hamlet located partly in the Town of Riverhead: Calverton
 Hamlet located partly in the Town of Smithtown: Lake Ronkonkoma
 Hamlet located partly in the Town of Southampton: Eastport
 Village located partly in the Town of Smithtown: Lake Grove

Town of Southampton 

 Villages: North Haven, Quogue, Sagaponack, Southampton, Westhampton Beach, West Hampton Dunes
 Village located partly in the Town of East Hampton: Sag Harbor
 Hamlets: Bridgehampton, East Quogue, Flanders, Hampton Bays, Northampton, North Sea, Noyack (Noyac), Quiogue, Remsenburg, Riverside, Shinnecock Hills, Speonk, Tuckahoe, Water Mill (Watermill), Westhampton
 Hamlet located partly in the Town of Brookhaven: Eastport

Town of Riverhead 

 Villages: none
 Hamlets: Aquebogue, Baiting Hollow, Jamesport, Northville, Riverhead, Wading River
 Hamlet located partly in the Town of Brookhaven: Calverton

Town of East Hampton

 Villages: East Hampton
 Village located partly in the Town of Southampton: Sag Harbor
 Hamlets: Amagansett, East Hampton North, Montauk, Napeague, Northwest Harbor, Springs, Wainscott

Town of Shelter Island 

 Village: Dering Harbor
 Hamlets: Shelter Island, Shelter Island Heights

Town of Southold 

 Village: Greenport
 Hamlets: Cutchogue, East Marion, Fishers Island, Greenport West, Laurel, Mattituck, Orient, New Suffolk, Peconic, Southold

Fire Island 

Fire Island is not a separate town, but its villages are listed here due to its geographical isolation.

 Villages in the Town of Islip: Ocean Beach, Saltaire
 Hamlets in the Town of Brookhaven: Cherry Grove (a.k.a. Fire Island), Fire Island Pines.
 Other communities: Atlantique, Bayberry Dunes, Corneille Estates, Davis Park, Dunewood, Fair Harbor, Kismet, Lonelyville, Long Cove, Ocean Bay Park, Point o' Woods, Robbins Rest, Seaview, Watch Hill, Water Island, West Fire Island

See also
Timeline of town creation in Downstate New York

References

Long Island
Municipalities